María Victoria Calle Correa (born 8 May 1959) is a Magistrate of the Constitutional Court of Colombia, serving since April 2009. Calle is the second female magistrate (after Clara Inés Vargas Hernández). A lawyer from the University of Medellín, she specialized in Administrative Law from Saint Thomas Aquinas University and the University of Salamanca, and received a Master's in Administrative Law from Externado University. Prior to her nomination, she worked in Previsora Seguros S.A., and insurance provider, since 2004, and was its vice president of legal affairs since 2005.

Constitutional Court magistrate

Nomination and election
She was elected to replace Magistrate Manuel José Cepeda Espinosa by the Senate from a ternary submitted by President Álvaro Uribe Vélez, receiving 76 of the votes over her fellow nominees, Zayda del Carmen Barrero de Noguera and José Fernando Torres. The nomination and subsequent election process, as well as that of her fellow magistrate Jorge Pretelt Chlajub which occurred at the same time, were criticised by Elección Visible, an election watchdog organization, for lack of transparency and the clear existence of back-door deals that permitted their election to have been secured from the beginning, and thus ignoring the ternary nomination process in which three compelling candidates are nominated and the Senate elects the best option; in their respective cases, each ternary list was composed of the favourite candidate and two lesser choices. This lack of seriousness in the process was coupled in the media with the perception that President Uribe broke tradition by nominating candidates who were neither constitutional scholars, respected professors in academia, nor held a PhDin marked contrast to their predecessors in the Court.

Magistrateship
Calle's views were unknown at the time of her nomination and was generally regarded as a conservative, as her husband, Gustavo Eduardo Gómez Aranguren, a Magistrate of the Council of State had defined conservative views, and because of her nomination and strong backing by the conservative leaning Administration of President Uribe. Nonetheless during her tenure, she backed most of the liberal block rulings such as Same-sex marriage and adoption by same sex couples, women rights and animal rights.

See also
 Carlos Gaviria Díaz

References

External links
 Constitutional Court of Colombia: Profile of Magistrate Calle Correa

1959 births
Living people
People from Medellín
Magistrates of the Constitutional Court of Colombia
20th-century Colombian lawyers
Colombian women lawyers
Universidad de Medellín alumni
University of Salamanca alumni
21st-century Colombian judges